Dear Friend: The Three Bachelors (Filipino: "Love Triangle") is a Philippine drama that aired on GMA Network. It is the eighth installment of the Dear Friend series.

Plot
The drama is about two love triangles between Emily, a maid who has a crush with her boss Miguel, and Sara, whom Miguel likes. However, Sara marrying to Vince, Miguel's brother. Heime, another of Miguel's brothers, likes gambling but stops when he discovers that he was adopted. Vince likes Sara, and they are married for his father who is to die in a few weeks.

Ending
Emily finally learns that Miguel doesn't love her, so she leaves, while Sara finally learns to love Vince. Emily goes to visit Sara and tells her that Miguel needs her but Sara doesn't want him anymore. They visit Vince's father but are shocked because it is discovered that Heime was trying to kill him, and he kidnaps Sara and Emily for five million pesos, to pay off his gambling debts. Vince is later shot in the arm and Emily in the back. Miguel realizes that he loved Emily all along and discovered that Emily was pregnant. At the end, Heime dies.

Main Characters
Kyla as Sara
Jay R as Vince
Mart Escudero as Miguel
Jennica Garcia as Emily the maid
Paulo Avelino as Heime

Extended Cast
Toby Alejar as TBA
Patani as Maid

External links
www.pep.ph

GMA Network drama series